The 2008 World Thoroughbred Rankings was the 2008 edition of the World Thoroughbred Rankings. It was an assessment of Thoroughbred racehorses issued by the International Federation of Horseracing Authorities (IFHA) in January 2009. It included horses aged three or older which competed in flat races anywhere in the world during 2008. It was the first edition to be open to all horses irrespective of where they raced or were trained. In previous years the IFHA had published two separate listings – a "Northern Hemisphere" edition in January, and a "Southern Hemisphere" version in August.

This year's joint-highest ratings were awarded to Curlin for his performances in both the Dubai World Cup and the Stephen Foster Handicap, and to New Approach for his win in the Champion Stakes. Each was given a rating of 130. A total of 288 horses were included in the list.

Full rankings for 2008
 For a detailed guide to this table, see below.

Top ranked horses
The following table shows the top ranked horses overall, the top three-year-olds, the top older horses and the top fillies and mares in the 2008 Rankings. It also shows the leading performers in various subdivisions of each group, which are defined by the distances of races, and the surfaces on which they are run.

Guide
A complete guide to the main table above.

References

World Thoroughbred Racehorse Rankings
World Thoroughbred Rankings 2008